Nataliya Voronova (born 21 March 1986) is a Kazakhstani rower. She competed in the women's lightweight double sculls event at the 2008 Summer Olympics.

References

1986 births
Living people
Kazakhstani female rowers
Olympic rowers of Kazakhstan
Rowers at the 2008 Summer Olympics
Sportspeople from Karaganda
20th-century Kazakhstani women
21st-century Kazakhstani women